YSR Aasara is a program launched by the Government of Andhra Pradesh to improve the productivity of Self Help Groups(SHGs) by reimbursing the outstanding loans and improve the lifestyle of urban and rural women.

Development 
The scheme was launched by Chief minister of Andhra Pradesh Y. S. Jagan Mohan Reddy on 11 September 2020 in a virtual meeting with district collectors and a few beneficiaries where the first installment of ₹6792 crore was released out of ₹27169 Crore outstanding bank loans.

The scheme 
YSR Aasara has been launched in order to uplift rural and urban women of Self Help Groups (SHGs) by clearing their existing bank loans and supporting them in production, manufacturing and marketing of their future establishments. The beneficiaries were given complete freedom in utilizing the sanctioned funds without any terms and conditions. Society For Elimination Of Rural Poverty (SERP) and Mission For Elimination Of Poverty In Municipal Areas(MEPMA) is directed to guide and co ordinate the process for individuals who are interested in investing in business opportunities.

References 

2020 establishments in Andhra Pradesh
Government welfare schemes in Andhra Pradesh